Mauricio Alejandro Montes Sanguinetti (born 22 June 1982 in Lima) is a Peruvian footballer who plays as a striker for Cusco FC in the Torneo Descentralizado.

Club career

Early career
Montes played for Segunda División Peruana team C.D. Bella Esperanza in the 2001 season. He scored 4 goals and his club finished in third that season.

Juan Aurich
On July 27, 2010, it was announced that Montes rescinded his contract with Cienciano due to unpaid wages and signed for Club Juan Aurich. It was reported that he also received a contract offer from his previous club Alianza Lima, but he preferred the one offered by Juan Aurich. He joined the Chiclayo based club along with Nelinho Quina for the second part of the 2010 season.
On September 18, 2010, he made his debut for Juan Aurich as a starter in a league match against León de Huánuco, which ended in a 1-1 draw.
In the 2011 season Montes scored a hat-trick in an away league match against Sport Boys, which finished 5-0 in favor of Juan Aurich.

Honours

Club
Juan Aurich
 Torneo Descentralizado (1): 2011

References

External links
 

1982 births
Living people
Footballers from Lima
Peruvian people of Italian descent
Association football forwards
Peruvian footballers
C.D. Bella Esperanza footballers
Club Alianza Lima footballers
Atlético Universidad footballers
Club Deportivo Universidad de San Martín de Porres players
Cienciano footballers
Juan Aurich footballers
Real Garcilaso footballers
Sport Huancayo footballers
Club Deportivo Universidad César Vallejo footballers
Peruvian Segunda División players
Peruvian Primera División players